"Fireball" is a song by the English rock band Deep Purple, from the album of the same name. It was also released as the band's second single of 1971, and peaked at No. 15 on the UK Singles Chart.

Background
The song is one of several based on Ian Gillan's real life experiences: "She was a complete mystery to me. This is another tale of unrequited love", he explained.

The song begins with the sound of an air conditioner being switched on, recorded by assistant engineer Mike Thorne. Roger Glover suggested to engineer Martin Birch that the sound of a machine starting up would be a good way to begin both the song and the album, but Birch could not think of anything available that would fit the purpose. Thorne suggested the sound of an air conditioning unit, and duly recorded it, to the band's delight. At the time the members of Deep Purple claimed that the sound was produced by a "special" synthesizer. A promo clip was made for the song, consisting of the band miming to the studio recording in front of a dancing audience.

Personnel
Ian Gillanvocals, tambourine
Ritchie Blackmoreguitar
Roger Gloverbass
Jon Lordorgan
Ian Paicedrums

References

Deep Purple songs
1971 songs
Songs written by Ritchie Blackmore
Songs written by Ian Gillan
Songs written by Roger Glover
Songs written by Jon Lord
Songs written by Ian Paice